Ion Sula (born 10 August 1980) is a Moldovan politician who served as Minister of Agriculture and Food Industry of Moldova since 18 February 2015, succeeding at this post Vasile Bumacov (2011-2015), until 20 January 2016.

Ion Sula is married and has two children.

References

1980 births
Living people
Liberal Democratic Party of Moldova politicians
Moldovan Ministers of Agriculture
People from Ialoveni District
Romanian people of Moldovan descent